Wolfgang Huber is a German computational biologist who serves as group leader for the Huber Group at the European Molecular Biology Laboratory (EMBL), where he is also a senior scientist. He is a founding member of Bioconductor and, alongside Sascha Dietrich, serves the joint head of the Molecular Medicine Partnership Unit's group Systems Medicine of Cancer Drugs.

Awards and honors
In 2021, Huber was elected as a Fellow of the International Society for Computational Biology.

References

External links
Huber Group Website

Living people
21st-century German biologists
Computational biologists
University of Freiburg alumni
Year of birth missing (living people)